Fire and Ice is a 1983 American animated epic dark fantasy adventure film directed by Ralph Bakshi. The film, a collaboration between Bakshi and Frank Frazetta, was distributed by 20th Century-Fox, which also distributed Bakshi's 1977 release Wizards. The animated feature, based on characters co-created by Bakshi and Frazetta, was made using the process of rotoscoping, in which scenes were shot in live-action and then traced onto animation cels.

The screenplay was written by Gerry Conway and Roy Thomas, both of whom had written Conan stories for Marvel Comics. The background painter was James Gurney, the author and artist of the Dinotopia illustrated novels. Iconic American painter Thomas Kinkade also worked on the backgrounds to various scenes. Peter Chung, the creator of Aeon Flux, was a layout artist.

Plot 
From their citadel Icepeak, the evil queen Juliana and her son Nekron send forth a wave of glaciers; this forces humanity to retreat south towards the equator. Nekron sends a delegation to Firekeep, the volcano citadel of king Jarol, ostensibly to request the king's surrender. In truth, the ice queen has orchestrated it as a ruse so that her subhuman troops can abduct Jarol's beautiful daughter, princess Teegra. Juliana feels that Nekron should take her as a bride to produce an heir.

Teegra escapes her captors and comes upon a young warrior named Larn, the only survivor of a village destroyed by Nekron's glaciers. The two grow close, but they become separated when Larn is attacked by a monstrous giant squid, and Nekron's subhumans recapture Teegra. She briefly escapes again, but runs into the witch Roleil and her son Otwa, who intend to use her as a bargaining chip for incurring Nekron's favor. However, the subhumans simply kill them and take Teegra to Icepeak. Nekron refuses to marry Teegra, in spite of his mother's plan, but keeps the princess as a hostage.

While looking for Teegra, Larn encounters Darkwolf, a mysterious masked warrior who pursues a personal vendetta against Nekron and Juliana. While Darkwolf holds off Nekron's horde, Larn continues his search and comes upon Roleil's remains, which briefly reanimate and tell him how to find the princess. At the same time, Jarol sends his son, Prince Taro, to Nekron to bargain for Teegra's release. With Larn as a stowaway on their ship, Taro and his emissaries reach Icepeak. Nekron refuses to release Teegra and insults her, inciting Taro to attack him.  Using his magic, Nekron forces the prince and his delegation to kill each other.

Larn infiltrates the ice fortress, but fails to retrieve Teegra and is rescued by Darkwolf. They travel to Firekeep to inform Jarol, who decides to give them time to penetrate Icepeak and rescue his daughter until the glacier crosses the border to his realm, forcing him to release the lava from the volcano to destroy the advancing ice. With some help from Jarol's dragon hawk riders, they assault the fortress, but only Darkwolf manages to reach Nekron. Larn, stranded midway during the attack, finally finds and rescues Teegra from Juliana. Darkwolf slays Nekron, but Nekron's dying agony expands the glacier explosively, prompting Jarol to open the volcano's valves. The lava flow swiftly overcomes the glacier, obliterating Icepeak, Juliana, and the subhuman army.

Larn and Teegra barely succeed in escaping the cataclysm. When they encounter a wounded subhuman, Larn prepares to kill him, but Teegra stops him and they embrace with a kiss. From atop a cliff, a smiling Darkwolf briefly watches the pair, then disappears.

Cast

Production 
By 1982, fantasy films had proven to be considerably successful at the box office, including The Beastmaster and Conan the Barbarian, and Bakshi had a desire to work with long-time friend and fantasy illustrator Frank Frazetta. Bakshi received $1.2 million to finance Fire and Ice from some of the same investors as American Pop, and 20th Century-Fox agreed to distribute the film based upon the financial longevity of Wizards.

Because Fire and Ice was the most action-oriented story Bakshi had directed up until that point, rotoscoping was again used, and the realism of the animation and design replicated Frazetta's artwork. Bakshi and Frazetta were heavily involved in the production of the live-action sequences, from casting sessions to the final shoot. The film's crew included background artists James Gurney and Thomas Kinkade, layout artist Peter Chung, and established Bakshi Productions artists Sparey, Steven E. Gordon, Bell and Banks. Chung strongly admired Bakshi and Frazetta's work, and animated his sequences on the film while simultaneously working for The Walt Disney Company.

Reception 
Janet Maslin of The New York Times wrote, "If you love comic books but can't bear the unnecessary bother of turning pages, 'Fire and Ice' [...] may be for you. It would help if you were a sex-obsessed 12-year old boy, but it isn't essential." Gene Siskel of the Chicago Tribune gave the film two stars out of four and called it "attractive to look at, but its slow-moving, predictable story makes viewing it much like reading a comic book with pages made of lead." He added that "the constant rhythm of Teegra being captured and rescued and captured and rescued is, after a while, more than a bit tiring." Sheila Benson of the Los Angeles Times wrote that "in spite of all the glorious washes in the background, which do indeed have the Frazetta look, 'Fire and Ice' is as unintentionally funny a fantasy as you could hope for." Donald Greig of The Monthly Film Bulletin called the action sequences "impressive enough" but stated that "the animators' fetishistic fascination with the human form ... underlines the two-dimensionality of the script, for the artwork is certainly the only fleshing-out that characters receive."

Colin Greenland reviewed Fire and Ice for Imagine magazine, and stated that "Much more enjoyable is his earlier Wizards, now on video from CBS/Fox, a fantasy with a sly sense of humour. Compared with this, Fire and Ice is a bit glum."

Andrew Leal wrote, "The plot is standard [...] recalling nothing so much as a more graphic episode of Filmation's He-Man series. [...] Fire and Ice essentially stands as a footnote to the spate of barbarian films that followed in the wake of Arnold Schwarzenegger's appearance as Conan."

In 2003, the Online Film Critics Society ranked the film as the 99th greatest animated film of all time.

Home media 
The film was released on VHS, Betamax, CED, and LaserDisc by RCA/Columbia Pictures Home Video in 1983. GoodTimes Home Video re-released the film on VHS in 1988. In 2005, it was released on DVD by Blue Underground Entertainment on a limited edition two-disc set, paired with the documentary Frazetta: Painting With Fire, about the film's co-creator and producer, Frank Frazetta. The company later released the film on Blu-ray in 2008 with Remastered 1080p video and a 7.1 surround sound remix in both Dolby TrueHD and DTS-HD Master Audio.

Remake 
In 2010, Robert Rodriguez announced that he would direct a live-action remake of the film. Bakshi stated that he did not want any involvement with the film, but he agreed to license the rights to Rodriguez. The deal closed shortly after Frazetta's death.  On December 18, 2014, Sony Pictures Entertainment acquired the filming rights to the live-action remake version of the film, to be directed by Robert Rodriguez.

See also 
 List of 20th Century Fox theatrical animated features

References

External links 

 
 
 
 
 Fire and Ice at Ralph Bakshi.com
 Online trailer at Blue Underground

1983 films
1983 animated films
1980s American animated films
1980s fantasy adventure films
20th Century Fox films
20th Century Fox animated films
American animated fantasy films
American fantasy adventure films
Animated adventure films
1980s English-language films
Films directed by Ralph Bakshi
Rotoscoped films
American sword and sorcery films
Films with screenplays by Roy Thomas
Films with screenplays by Gerry Conway
Films produced by Ralph Bakshi